The Las Cruces Police Department (LCPD) is the principal law enforcement agency responsible for protecting the City of Las Cruces, New Mexico. LCPD, established in 1928, currently has an authorized strength of 200 officers and 83 civilian positions; LCPD serves a community of over 100,000. The Las Cruces Police Department is the second largest municipal police department in New Mexico.

The interim chief of police is Miguel Dominguez. In June 2020 he replaced Patrick Gallagher who resigned in the aftermath of an officer killing a citizen.

Organization

The department is organized into a number of divisions and units:
Administration
Public information office

Field operations division
Patrol Section (Patrol Section, K-9 Unit, Crisis Intervention Unit, & Street Crimes Unit)
Traffic Section (Traffic Investigation, Police Service Aids)

Internal affairs
Investigative & support division
Administrative Support Section
Criminal Investigations Section
Codes Enforcement and Animal Control Section
Community Outreach (TNT Unit, School Resource Unit, & Community Liaison Officer)
Metro narcotics is a joint unit of the Las Cruces Police Department, the Doña Ana County Sheriff's Office, and New Mexico State Police
Research & development

The department runs its own police academy. The course takes five and a half months.

The department is allotted the following billets:

Equipment

Transportation
The Las Cruces Police uses the following vehicles.
Chevrolet Camaro
Dodge Charger
Lenco BearCat (SWAT Unit)
Ford Explorer(Interceptor)

Weapons
Accuracy International AWM (.338 Lapua Magnum) Used by SWAT team snipers.
Colt 9mm SMG
Remington 700 (.308 Winchester)

Notable events

In February 2020, officer Christopher Smelser killed Antonio Valenzuela during an arrest after a traffic stop. Valenzuela ran from police, who attempted to tase him, eventually subduing Valenzuela on the ground. In a video of the incident, Smelser told Valenzuela, "I'm going to fucking choke you out, bro", and Valenzuela was heard gasping for air be heard gasping for air. The autopsy ruled that Valenzuela died of "asphyxia injuries due to physical restraint", with the department's police chief stating that Smelser had used a "vascular neck restraint". The autopsy also stated that methamphetamines consumed by Valenzuela also "significantly" contributed to his death. 

After the police officer was charged with murder, he was fired. The city agreed to pay over six million dollars to settle the civil side of the matter.

References

External links
City of Las Cruces - Police Department website

Las Cruces, New Mexico
Municipal police departments of New Mexico
Government agencies established in 1928
1928 establishments in New Mexico